Meihuayuan Station is a metro station on Line 3 of the Guangzhou Metro. The underground station is located on the Meihuayuan Section of Guangzhou Avenue North  in the Baiyun District of Guangzhou. It started operation on 30October 2010.

Station layout

Exits

References

Railway stations in China opened in 2010
Guangzhou Metro stations in Baiyun District